Jerrold Jacob Katz (14 July 19327 February 2002) was an American philosopher and linguist.

Biography
After receiving a PhD in philosophy from Princeton University in 1960, Katz became a Research Associate in Linguistics at the Massachusetts Institute of Technology in 1961. He was appointed Assistant Professor of Philosophy there in 1963, and became Professor in 1969. From 1975 until his death, he was Distinguished Professor of Philosophy and Linguistics at the City University of New York.

Within linguistics, Katz is best known for his theory of semantics in generative grammar, which he refers to as the autonomous theory of sense (ATS). Katz was a staunch defender of rationalism (although not in a Cartesian/Fregean sense) and the metaphysical import of "essences".  He argued extensively against the dominance of empiricism. Katz also argued, against W. V. O. Quine, that the analytic–synthetic distinction could be founded on syntactical features of sentences.

Works
Katz, J. J. & Fodor, J. A. (1963). The structure of a semantic theory. Language, 39(2), Apr–Jun, 170–210.
The Philosophy of Language (1966)
The Underlying Reality of Language and Its Philosophical Import (1971)
Language and other Abstract Objects (1981)
The Metaphysics of Meaning (1990)
Realistic Rationalism (2000)
Sense, Reference, and Philosophy (2004; posthum.)

Notes

References 
 Obituary (New York Times)
D. Terence Langendoen (2005). "Katz, Jerrold J. (1932–2002)." In: Encyclopedia of Language and Linguistics, 2nd edition. Elsevier.
 William C. Dowling, "Jerrold Katz: A Personal Memory"

1932 births
2002 deaths
Linguists from the United States
People from Washington, D.C.
Philosophers of language
20th-century linguists
20th-century American philosophers